Ulaş is a town and district of Sivas Province in Turkey.

Ulaş, Ulas, or ULAS may also refer to:

People

Given or middle name
 Ulaş Bardakçı (1947–1972), Turkish communist
 Ulaş Güler (born 1980), Turkish footballer
 Ulas Hayes (1918–1990), American preacher and civil-rights icon
 Ulaş Mangıtlı, Turkish cartoonist and illustrator
 Ulaş Özdemir, Turkish Alevi musician
 Ulas Samchuk (1905–1987), Ukrainian writer, publicist and journalist
 Furkan Ulaş Memiş (born 1991), Turkish bantamweight boxer
 Gregory Ulas Powell (1933–2012), American murderer

Surname
 Elif Ulaş (born 1986), Turkish figure skater and ice hockey player
 Meliha Ulaş (1901–1941), Turkish parliamentarian and teacher 
 Ulas family, Turkish family who walk on all fours
 Vladimir Ulas (born 1960), Russian politician

Places
 Ulaş, a town and district, Sivas Province, Turkey
 Ulaş, Arhavi, a village in Arhavi district, Artvin Province, Turkey
 Ulaş, Dargeçit, a Kurdish depopulated village in Dargeçit district, Mardin Province, Turkey
 Ulaş, Gercüş, a village in Gercüş district, Batman Province, Turkey
 Ulaş, Kırıkkale, a populated place in Kırıkkale district, Kırıkkale Province, Turkey
 Ulaş, Milas, a populated place in Milas district, Muğla Province, Turkey
 Ulaş, Tarsus, a village in Tarsus district, Mersin Province, Turkey
 Ulaş, Tekirdağ, a town in Çorlu district, Tekirdağ Province, Turkey
 Ulaş, Tokat, a populated place in Tokat district, Tokat Province, Turkey
 Solovki Airport (ICAO code ULAS), Russian airport for the Solovetsky Islands

Other
 Battle of Ulaş, 1696 battle between the Ottoman and Habsburg armies 
 UKIDSS Large Area Survey (ULAS), an astronomical survey
 University of Leicester Archaeological Services (ULAS)
 University of London Air Squadron (ULAS), part of the Royal Air Force Volunteer Reserve

See also
 Ula (disambiguation)
 Ulhas (disambiguation)